The 2009 Tennislife Cup was a professional tennis tournament played on outdoor red clay courts. It was the third edition of the tournament which was part of the 2009 ATP Challenger Tour. It took place in Naples, Italy between 28 September and 4 October 2009.

Singles main draw entrants

Seeds

 Rankings are as of September 21, 2009.

Other entrants
The following players received wildcards into the singles main draw:
  Enrico Fioravante
  Giancarlo Petrazzuolo
  Adrian Ungur
  Filippo Volandri

The following players received wildcards into the singles main draw:
  Miguel Ángel López Jaén
  Albert Ramos-Viñolas

The following players received entry from the qualifying draw:
  Alberto Brizzi
  Reda El Amrani
  Sergio Gutiérrez-Ferrol
  Matwé Middelkoop

The following players received a lucky loser entry:
  Benjamin Balleret
  Marco Crugnola

Champions

Singles

 Frederico Gil def.  Potito Starace, 2–6, 6–1, 6–4

Doubles

 Frederico Gil /  Ivan Dodig def.  Thiago Alves /  Lukáš Rosol, 6–1, 6–3

External links
Official website
ITF Search 
2009 Draws

Tennislife Cup
Tennislife Cup
Clay court tennis tournaments